Kyzyl-Ozyok (Kızıl-Özök) is a rural locality (a selo) and the administrative centre of Kyzyl-Ozyokskoye Rural Settlement of Mayminsky District, the Altai Republic, Russia. The population was 4746 as of 2016. There are 4 streets.

Geography 
Kyzyl-Ozyok is located 18 km southeast of Mayma (the district's administrative centre) by road. Gorno-Altaysk is the nearest rural locality.

References 

Rural localities in Mayminsky District